Christian Keener "Red" Cagle (May 1, 1905 – December 26, 1942) was an American athlete who was a three time All-American in football playing for the United States Military Academy Army football team. A star halfback, Cagle's prominence landed him on the cover of Time magazine in 1929.

For five seasons, running from 1930 to 1934, Cagle played professional football in the National Football League (NFL). His 1932 salary with the New York Football Giants was second highest in the entire league. The following year Cagle became a co-owner of the new Brooklyn Dodgers NFL franchise, for which he also played, selling his stake upon his retirement in 1934.

Cagle was inducted into the College Football Hall of Fame in 1954.

College career
Cagle first starred at the University of Louisiana at Lafayette (then named Southwestern Louisiana Institute or SLI) from 1922 to 1925, where he earned a degree in arts and sciences. In his career at Southwestern Louisiana, he scored 235 points from touchdowns, extra points and field goals, a school record that lasted until 1989. His time at Southwestern Louisiana has him placed among the all-time greats of early Southern football. Besides being the football captain (1925), he also was a star in basketball and track and field sports at Southwestern Louisiana, where he received a degree in arts and sciences.

Cagle then played football for four years in the Army football team at the United States Military Academy, from 1926 to 1929, but did not graduate because he had secretly married in August 1928 in violation of Academy rules. He was forced to resign in May 1930. Known as the "Red Thunderbolt of West Point," he was an All-American halfback for the last three years. His longest runs were 75 yards against Yale, 1928; 70 yards against Ohio Wesleyan, and 65 yards against Yale, 1929. In four years at Army he scored 169 points, averaged 6.4 yards per attempt in rushing and 26.4 yards on kickoff returns.

As the team captain in 1929, he was featured on the September 23 cover of Time magazine of that same year. Cagle was noted for playing with the chin strap loose from his helmet, and sometimes without helmet. Sportswriters liked to refer to him as "Onward Christian" because of his ability to advance the ball.

Professional career

Cagle played professional football for five seasons, including the New York Giants from 1930 to 1932. During his final year with the Giants Cagel was the highest paid member of the team, earning a handsome $500 per game — second in the entire league to the $550 per game earned by superstar halfback Red Grange of the Chicago Bears.

In 1933, he and fellow former New York Giants player John Simms Kelly became co-owners of the NFL's Brooklyn Dodgers franchise. Cagle played for the team in 1933 and 1934. Dan Topping bought Cagle's half of the team in 1934.

Personal life
Born in Merryville, Louisiana, he was one of eight children, including five brothers and two sisters.  Cagle was named after an uncle, who in turn was named after the late Bishop Christian Keener of the Methodist church.  He attended high school in Merryville, a small community about 20 miles (30 km) southwest of De Ridder.  According to local legend, he was known for getting off the school bus and racing it to school, a race that he quite often won.  The football field at Merryville High School is named Keener Cagle Field in his honor.

He secretly married Marian Haile in 1928 after meeting her at Louisiana-Lafayette.

Cagle died in 1942, at 37 years of age, from a peculiar mishap the day after Christmas (December 26). He was discovered unconscious at the bottom of a Manhattan subway stairwell.  According to The Advertiser report, "Cagle tripped and fell the full length of a flight of subway steps." He died three days later of a fractured skull.  At the time of his death he had lived in a Queens apartment house with his wife and was employed by an insurance company.

Head coaching record

References

Other source consulted
 College Football Historical Society, vol. 13, no. 1, November 1999.

External links
 
 
 

1905 births
1942 deaths
American football halfbacks
American men's basketball players
Army Black Knights football players
Brooklyn Dodgers (NFL) players
Louisiana Ragin' Cajuns football players
Louisiana Ragin' Cajuns men's basketball players
Louisiana Ragin' Cajuns men's track and field athletes
Mississippi State Bulldogs football coaches
National Football League owners
New York Giants players
All-American college football players
College Football Hall of Fame inductees
People from DeRidder, Louisiana
Coaches of American football from Louisiana
Players of American football from Louisiana
Basketball players from Louisiana
Track and field athletes from Louisiana
Accidental deaths from falls